Chrysomela knabi is a species of leaf beetle in the family Chrysomelidae. It is found in North America.

Subspecies
These two subspecies belong to the species Chrysomela knabi:
 Chrysomela knabi hesperia Brown, 1961
 Chrysomela knabi knabi Brown, 1956

References

Further reading

 
 
 

Chrysomelinae
Articles created by Qbugbot
Beetles described in 1956